The Minangkabau Malaysians are citizens of the Malaysia whose ancestral roots are from Minangkabau of central Sumatra. This includes people born in the Malaysia who are of Minangkabau origin as well as Minangkabau who have migrated to Malaysia. Today, Minangkabau comprise about 989,000 people in Malaysia, and Malaysian law considers most of them to be Malays. They are majority in urban areas, which has traditionally had the highest education and a strong entrepreneurial spirit. The history of the Minangkabau migration to Malay peninsula has been recorded to have lasted a very long time. When the means of transportation were still using the ships by down the rivers and crossing the strait, many Minang people migrated to various regions such as Negeri Sembilan, Malacca, Penang, Kedah, Perak, and Pahang. Some scholars noted that the arrival of the Minangkabau to the Malay Peninsula occurred in the 12th century. This ethnic group moved in to peninsula at the height of the Sultanate of Malacca, and maintains the Adat Perpatih of matrilineal kinships system in Negeri Sembilan and north Malacca.  

The Minangkabau Malaysians is the largest Overseas Minangkabau outside of Indonesia, more than Minangkabau communities in the Singapore, Saudi Arabia, and Australia. Minangkabau exerted cultural influences on Malaysia, especially cuisine, music, language, and martial arts. Today, the cross-strait relations between the Minangkabau of Sumatra and Minangkabau Malaysian is quite good. To support this relationship, in 2014 was established Pertubuhan Jaringan Masyarakat Minangkabau Malaysia (Minangkabau Malaysian Association) in Kuala Lumpur.

Regions

Negeri Sembilan

The Minangkabau people are quite dominant in Negeri Sembilan, in terms of population, politics, and culture. At the early 14th century, the Minangkabau arrived in Negeri Sembilan. They had a more advanced civilization than the Orang Asli, an indigenous tribe of Negeri Sembilan. Intermarriage between Minangkabau and Orang Asli create the new tribe, Biduanda. The initial migration of the Minangkabau people mostly came from the Tanah Datar and Lima Puluh Kota regencies.

Prior to the establishment of the Yang di-Pertuan Besar institution, Negeri Sembilan was under the auspices of the Sultanate of Johor. In 1773, Negeri Sembilan took Raja Melewar to Pagaruyung, and became a separate kingdom from Johor. Until 1820s, the leaders of Minangkabau communities derived their authority directly from their Sumatran homeland. Present day, Yang di-Pertuan Besar of Negeri Sembilan is the Minangkabau of Pagaruyung descent. They are elected by a council of ruling chiefs in the state, or the Undangs. Due to the implementation of the Adat Perpatih, the Minangkabau of Negeri Sembilan still inherit their tribes and inheritance based on the matrilineal line.

Penang
Minangkabau have settled in Penang island since the early 18th century. The first known Minangkabau settlers were Nakhoda Bayan, Nakhoda Intan, and Nakhoda Kecil. They received the appropriate permissions by Ahmad Tajuddin, the sultan of Kedah, and then opened up the settlements in Bayan Lepas, Balik Pulau, Gelugor, and Tanjung (now George Town). Other Minang traders, Datuk Jannaton and Datuk Maharaja Setia who came in 1749, opened up Batu Uban area. In the 20th century, many Minang merchants were running printing businesses, such as Yusof Rawa and Hussamuddin Yaacob. One of the most prominent Minang of Penangites is Hamdan Sheikh Tahir. He was the Yang di-Pertua Negeri (literally "head of state") of Penang from 1989 to 2001.

Selangor
Minangkabau arrivals in Selangor was relatively recent compared to Negeri Sembilan or Penang. They arrived in Selangor around the mid of 19th century as a result of the Padri War. At that time, migrating to Klang (pai ka Kolang) was popular among the Minang young people. The first group of Minang people came to Selangor, most of whom were mining businessmen, such as Haji Mohamed Taib, Khatib Koyan, and Bagindo Samah. Minangkabau migration to Selangor increased dramatically in the late 1940s due to Indonesian independence war. They primarily became merchants and shop-owners. In the Greater Kuala Lumpur many of them have fashion stores and restaurant. Currently, Minangkabau restaurant, known as Nasi Padang Restaurant, is one of the most visible food stalls in Selangor.

Notable people

There are many Minangkabau people who work as merchants, clerics, authors, and politicians who have made great contributions in Malaysia. In the 19th century, Muhammad Saleh Al-Minankabawi became the mufti of the Perak Sultanate and Uthman bin Abdullah became the first qadi in Kuala Lumpur. In addition, Haji Mohamed Taib, who has a fairly large business, became one of the developer Chow Kit area in Kuala Lumpur, as well as Abdul Rahim Kajai, a leading pioneer of Malay journalism. In the mid-20th century, Minangkabau descents are a distinctive and influential group in the nation's politics. Tuanku Abdul Rahman was appointed as the first Yang di-Pertuan Agong of the Federation of Malaya. Besides that, many Minang figures became Malaysian party leaders. Some of them were Abdullah C.D., Ahmad Boestamam, Burhanuddin al-Hilmi, Shamsiah Fakeh, Khadijah Sidek, and Mokhtaruddin Lasso.

After Malaysian independence, many Malaysian ministers are Minangkabau descent, such as Abdul Aziz Shamsuddin, Abdul Samad Idris, Aishah Ghani, Amirsham Abdul Aziz, Aziz Ishak, Ghafar Baba, Ghazali Shafie, Khairy Jamaluddin, Muhammad bin Haji Muhammad Taib, Rais Yatim, and Shaziman Abu Mansor. Interestingly, Malaysia's longest serving female minister is Rafidah Aziz, Perak-born Minang descent. Some prominent Malaysian businessmen are Minang people, namely Nasimuddin Amin, Kamarudin Meranun, and Tunku Abdullah. In addition to politicians and merchants, Minangkabau people who are quite meritorious include Zainal Abidin Ahmad, author and language experts; Tahir Jalaluddin, influential Islamic scholar; Muszaphar Shukor, first Malaysian astronaut; U-Wei Haji Saari, one of Malaysia's best film directors; Ismail Mohamed Ali, governor of Bank Negara Malaysia; Abdul Aziz Zainal, commander-in-chief of the Malaysian Armed Forces, as well as Saiful Bahri, the prominent of Malaysia's composer.

See also
 Indonesian Malaysians
 Minangkabau in Singapore

Reference

Ethnic groups in Malaysia
Minangkabau diaspora
Indonesian diaspora

id:Orang Minangkabau di Malaysia